BBC Look North is the BBC's regional television news service for North East England, Cumbria and parts of North Yorkshire. The service is produced and broadcast from the BBC Broadcasting Centre on Barrack Road in Newcastle upon Tyne with district newsrooms based in Carlisle, Durham, Middlesbrough and York.

Reception
The programme can be watched in any part of the UK (and Europe) from Astra 2E on Freesat channel 956 and Sky channel 955. It no longer broadcasts on analogue, since the digital switchover in September 2012, and digital terrestrial from the Bilsdale, Caldbeck, Chatton and the Pontop Pike transmitters. The latest edition of Look North is also available to watch on the BBC iPlayer.

History

Prior to the start of Look North, the BBC television region for the North East and Cumbria launched at 6.10pm on Monday 5 January 1959 from studios at 54 New Bridge Street in Newcastle City Centre. The region began receiving its own nightly news bulletins, originally presented by George House and Tom Kilgour.

Previously, the area was served by a pan-regional bulletin from Manchester entitled News from the North, broadcast across the whole of Northern England from 30 September 1957 onwards.

The new local bulletins from Newcastle were launched ten days before the opening of rival ITV station Tyne Tees Television in the North East (Border Television, serving Cumbria, opened in September 1961).

Three years after the launch of the television service, the bulletins were expanded to 20 minutes and relaunched as a daily magazine programme, Home at Six, presented by Frank Bough.

After Bough left to join BBC Sport in 1964, Home at Six was relaunched with a new name and a new presenter - Mike Neville, an actor and continuity announcer for Tyne Tees Television who had been anchor of North East Newsview, a nightly regional news programme, for only a few months. Neville soon became a household name and spent the next thirty-two years at the BBC in Newcastle, presenting Look North as well as making regular appearances on Nationwide.

For a short period in the late 1980s, Cumbria was switched to the BBC North West region and began receiving North West Tonight instead of Look North, along with a short lunchtime news opt-out. Look North returned to Cumbria on 27 September 1992.

The North East and Cumbria region was reformed after campaigning by viewers in Cumbria that they were being overlooked in favour of news from the more populous areas of the north west, such as Greater Manchester and Merseyside.

It was during this time that on 16 January 1988, BBC North East moved to brand new purpose built studios nicknamed 'The Pink Palace' on Barrack Road in Spital Tongues, along with Radio Newcastle.

In 1996, Mike Neville left the BBC after 32 years to re-join Tyne Tees Television to present their flagship evening news programme North East Tonight. Look North underwent major changes with new presenters Carol Malia and John Lawrence (both former reporters for Tyne Tees) introduced to the programme. Malia is now the main presenter.

Broadcast times
On weekdays, Look North broadcasts six three-minute opt-outs during BBC Breakfast at 27 minutes past and 3 minutes to each hour. A ten-minute lunchtime programme follows at 1:35pm with the main half-hour edition at 6:30pm and a ten-minute late update is shown at 10:25pm, following the BBC News at Ten.

Look North also airs three bulletins during the weekend: early evening bulletins on Saturday and Sunday and a late night bulletin on Sundays, following the BBC News at Ten. The times of these bulletins usually vary.

Presenters

News
Carol Malia - Main presenter (Monday-Wednesday) and Wednesday lates
Jeff Brown
Dawn Thewlis

Weather
Paul Mooney
Jennifer Bartram
Keeley Donovan 
Paul Hudson

Former on air team

See also
BBC North East and Cumbria's rival regional news programmes.
ITV News Tyne Tees which covers news stories from County Durham, Northumberland, parts of North Yorkshire, Teesside and Tyne and Wear.
Lookaround which covers news stories from Cumbria, Dumfries and Galloway and the Scottish Borders (on the western side).

References

External links

BBC Regional News shows
Mass media in Newcastle upon Tyne
1950s British television series
1960s British television series
1970s British television series
1980s British television series
1990s British television series
2000s British television series
2010s British television series
2020s British television series
1959 British television series debuts
English-language television shows
Television news in England
Television news program articles using incorrect naming style